The Royal Theatre Center is located in the Chapinero neighborhood in the city of Bogotá. It is a modern theater that can hold music, theater and television events.

The maximum capacity of the theatre is 4,500 people, it is the largest theater located in Bogotá. Its facilities include restrooms, special boxes, meeting room, seats, food court, telephones and emergency exits.

Events
Today this complex is used for organizing concerts due to its versatility. The artists that have performed in this place include:

See also 
 Teatro Metropol de Bogotá
 Downtown Majestic

Theatres in Bogotá
Tourist attractions in Bogotá